Nebria speiseri is a species of ground beetle in the Nebriinae subfamily that can be found in all states of former Yugoslavia except for Croatia, North Macedonia, and Slovenia.

References

External links
Nebria speiseri at Carabidae of the World

speiseri
Beetles described in 1891
Beetles of Europe